In mathematics, specifically general topology, compactness is a property that seeks to generalize the notion of a closed and bounded subset of Euclidean space. The idea is that a compact space has no "punctures" or "missing endpoints", i.e., it includes all limiting values of points. For example, the open interval (0,1) would not be compact because it excludes the limiting values of 0 and 1, whereas the closed interval [0,1] would be compact. However, the extended real number line would be compact, since it contains both infinities. There are many ways to make this heuristic notion precise. These ways usually agree in a metric space, but may not be equivalent in other topological spaces.

One such generalization is that a topological space is sequentially compact if every infinite sequence of points sampled from the space has an infinite subsequence that converges to some point of the space.

The Bolzano–Weierstrass theorem states that a subset of Euclidean space is compact in this sequential sense if and only if it is closed and bounded.

Thus, if one chooses an infinite number of points in the closed unit interval , some of those points will get arbitrarily close to some real number in that space. 
For instance, some of the numbers in the sequence  accumulate to 0 (while others accumulate to 1). 
Since neither 0 nor 1 are members of the open unit interval , those same sets of points would not accumulate to any point of it, so the open unit interval is not compact. Although subsets (subspaces) of Euclidean space can be compact, the entire space itself is not compact, since it is not bounded. For example, considering  (the real number line), the sequence of points  has no subsequence that converges to any real number.

Compactness was formally introduced by Maurice Fréchet in 1906 to generalize the Bolzano–Weierstrass theorem from spaces of geometrical points to spaces of functions. The Arzelà–Ascoli theorem and the Peano existence theorem exemplify applications of this notion of compactness to classical analysis. Following its initial introduction, various equivalent notions of compactness, including sequential compactness and limit point compactness, were developed in general metric spaces. In general topological spaces, however, these notions of compactness are not necessarily equivalent. The most useful notion — and the standard definition of the unqualified term compactness — is phrased in terms of the existence of finite families of open sets that "cover" the space in the sense that each point of the space lies in some set contained in the family. This more subtle notion, introduced by Pavel Alexandrov and Pavel Urysohn in 1929, exhibits compact spaces as generalizations of finite sets. In spaces that are compact in this sense, it is often possible to patch together information that holds locally — that is, in a neighborhood of each point — into corresponding statements that hold throughout the space, and many theorems are of this character.

The term compact set is sometimes used as a synonym for compact space, but also often refers to a compact subspace of a topological space.

Historical development 

In the 19th century, several disparate mathematical properties were understood that would later be seen as consequences of compactness.  On the one hand, Bernard Bolzano (1817) had been aware that any bounded sequence of points (in the line or plane, for instance) has a subsequence that must eventually get arbitrarily close to some other point, called a limit point. 
Bolzano's proof relied on the method of bisection: the sequence was placed into an interval that was then divided into two equal parts, and a part containing infinitely many terms of the sequence was selected. 
The process could then be repeated by dividing the resulting smaller interval into smaller and smaller parts — until it closes down on the desired limit point. 
The full significance of Bolzano's theorem, and its method of proof, would not emerge until almost 50 years later when it was rediscovered by Karl Weierstrass.

In the 1880s, it became clear that results similar to the Bolzano–Weierstrass theorem could be formulated for spaces of functions rather than just numbers or geometrical points. 
The idea of regarding functions as themselves points of a generalized space dates back to the investigations of Giulio Ascoli and Cesare Arzelà. 
The culmination of their investigations, the Arzelà–Ascoli theorem, was a generalization of the Bolzano–Weierstrass theorem to families of continuous functions, the precise conclusion of which was that it was possible to extract a uniformly convergent sequence of functions from a suitable family of functions. 
The uniform limit of this sequence then played precisely the same role as Bolzano's "limit point". 
Towards the beginning of the twentieth century, results similar to that of Arzelà and Ascoli began to accumulate in the area of integral equations, as investigated by David Hilbert and Erhard Schmidt. 
For a certain class of Green's functions coming from solutions of integral equations, Schmidt had shown that a property analogous to the Arzelà–Ascoli theorem held in the sense of mean convergence — or convergence in what would later be dubbed a Hilbert space. 
This ultimately led to the notion of a compact operator as an offshoot of the general notion of a compact space. 
It was Maurice Fréchet who, in 1906, had distilled the essence of the Bolzano–Weierstrass property and coined the term compactness to refer to this general phenomenon (he used the term already in his 1904 paper which led to the famous 1906 thesis).

However, a different notion of compactness altogether had also slowly emerged at the end of the 19th century from the study of the continuum, which was seen as fundamental for the rigorous formulation of analysis. 
In 1870, Eduard Heine showed that a continuous function defined on a closed and bounded interval was in fact uniformly continuous. In the course of the proof, he made use of a lemma that from any countable cover of the interval by smaller open intervals, it was possible to select a finite number of these that also covered it. 
The significance of this lemma was recognized by Émile Borel (1895), and it was generalized to arbitrary collections of intervals by Pierre Cousin (1895) and Henri Lebesgue (1904). The Heine–Borel theorem, as the result is now known, is another special property possessed by closed and bounded sets of real numbers.

This property was significant because it allowed for the passage from local information about a set (such as the continuity of a function) to global information about the set (such as the uniform continuity of a function). 
Ultimately, the Russian school of point-set topology, under the direction of Pavel Alexandrov and Pavel Urysohn, formulated Heine–Borel compactness in a way that could be applied to the modern notion of a topological space.   showed that the earlier version of compactness due to Fréchet, now called (relative) sequential compactness, under appropriate conditions followed from the version of compactness that was formulated in terms of the existence of finite subcovers. 
It was this notion of compactness that became the dominant one, because it was not only a stronger property, but it could be formulated in a more general setting with a minimum of additional technical machinery, as it relied only on the structure of the open sets in a space.

Basic examples 

Any finite space is compact; a finite subcover can be obtained by selecting, for each point, an open set containing it. A nontrivial example of a compact space is the (closed) unit interval  of real numbers. If one chooses an infinite number of distinct points in the unit interval, then there must be some accumulation point among these points in that interval. For instance, the odd-numbered terms of the sequence  get arbitrarily close to 0, while the even-numbered ones get arbitrarily close to 1. The given example sequence shows the importance of including the boundary points of the interval, since the limit points must be in the space itself — an open (or half-open) interval of the real numbers is not compact. 
It is also crucial that the interval be bounded, since in the interval , one could choose the sequence of points , of which no sub-sequence ultimately gets arbitrarily close to any given real number.

In two dimensions, closed disks are compact since for any infinite number of points sampled from a disk, some subset of those points must get arbitrarily close either to a point within the disc, or to a point on the boundary. However, an open disk is not compact, because a sequence of points can tend to the boundary — without getting arbitrarily close to any point in the interior. Likewise, spheres are compact, but a sphere missing a point is not since a sequence of points can still tend to the missing point, thereby not getting arbitrarily close to any point within the space. Lines and planes are not compact, since one can take a set of equally-spaced points in any given direction without approaching any point.

Definitions 

Various definitions of compactness may apply, depending on the level of generality. 
A subset of Euclidean space in particular is called compact if it is closed and bounded. This implies, by the Bolzano–Weierstrass theorem, that any infinite sequence from the set has a subsequence that converges to a point in the set. 
Various equivalent notions of compactness, such as sequential compactness and limit point compactness, can be developed in general metric spaces.

In contrast, the different notions of compactness are not equivalent in general topological spaces, and the most useful notion of compactness — originally called bicompactness — is defined using covers consisting of open sets (see Open cover definition below). 
That this form of compactness holds for closed and bounded subsets of Euclidean space is known as the Heine–Borel theorem. 
Compactness, when defined in this manner, often allows one to take information that is known locally — in a neighbourhood of each point of the space — and to extend it to information that holds globally throughout the space. 
An example of this phenomenon is Dirichlet's theorem, to which it was originally applied by Heine, that a continuous function on a compact interval is uniformly continuous; here, continuity is a local property of the function, and uniform continuity the corresponding global property.

Open cover definition

Formally, a topological space  is called compact if every  open cover of  has a finite subcover. That is,  is compact if for every collection  of open subsets of  such that

,

there is a finite subcollection  ⊆  such that

Some branches of mathematics such as algebraic geometry, typically influenced by the French school of Bourbaki, use the term quasi-compact for the general notion, and reserve the term compact for topological spaces that are both Hausdorff and quasi-compact. 
A compact set is sometimes referred to as a compactum, plural compacta.

Compactness of subsets 

A subset  of a topological space  is said to be compact if it is compact as a subspace (in the subspace topology). 
That is,  is compact if for every arbitrary collection  of open subsets of  such that

there is a finite subcollection  ⊆  such that

Compactness is a "topological" property.

Characterization 

If  is a topological space then the following are equivalent:
  is compact; i.e., every open cover of  has a finite subcover.
  has a sub-base such that every cover of the space, by members of the sub-base, has a finite subcover (Alexander's sub-base theorem).
  is Lindelöf and countably compact.
 Every net on  has a convergent subnet (see the article on nets for a proof).
 Every filter on  has a convergent refinement.
 Every net on  has a cluster point.
 Every filter on  has a cluster point.
 Every ultrafilter on  converges to at least one point.
 Every infinite subset of  has a complete accumulation point.
 For every topological space , the projection  is a closed mapping (see proper map).

Bourbaki defines a compact space (quasi-compact space) as a topological space where each filter has a cluster point (i.e., 8. in the above).

Euclidean space 

For any subset  of Euclidean space,  is compact if and only if it is closed and bounded; this is the Heine–Borel theorem.

As a Euclidean space is a metric space, the conditions in the next subsection also apply to all of its subsets. 
Of all of the equivalent conditions, it is in practice easiest to verify that a subset is closed and bounded, for example, for a closed interval or closed -ball.

Metric spaces 

For any metric space , the following are equivalent (assuming countable choice):
  is compact.
  is complete and totally bounded (this is also equivalent to compactness for uniform spaces).
  is countably compact; that is, every countable open cover of  has a finite subcover.
  is an image of a continuous function from the Cantor set.
 Every decreasing nested sequence of nonempty closed subsets  in  has a nonempty intersection.
 Every increasing nested sequence of proper open subsets  in  fails to cover .

A compact metric space  also satisfies the following properties:
  is second-countable, separable and Lindelöf – these three conditions are equivalent for metric spaces. The converse is not true; e.g., a countable discrete space satisfies these three conditions, but is not compact.
  is closed and bounded (as a subset of any metric space whose restricted metric is ). The converse may fail for a non-Euclidean space; e.g. the real line equipped with the discrete metric is closed and bounded but not compact, as the collection of all singletons of the space is an open cover which admits no finite subcover. It is complete but not totally bounded.

Ordered Spaces 

For an ordered space  (i.e. a totally ordered set equipped with the order topology), the following are equivalent:
  is compact.
 Every nonempty closed subset of  has a maximum and a minimum element.

An ordered space satisfying (any one of) these conditions is called a complete lattice.

In addition, the following are equivalent for all ordered spaces , and (assuming countable choice) are true whenever  is compact. (The converse in general fails if  is not also metrizable.):
 Every decreasing nested sequence of nonempty closed subsets  ⊇  ⊇ ... in  has a nonempty intersection.
 Every increasing nested sequence of proper open subsets  ⊆  ⊆ ... in  fails to cover .

Characterization by continuous functions 

For each , the evaluation map 
A topological space  is pseudocompact if and only if every maximal ideal in  has residue field the real numbers. 
For completely regular spaces, this is equivalent to every maximal ideal being the kernel of an evaluation homomorphism.  There are pseudocompact spaces that are not compact, though.

In general, for non-pseudocompact spaces there are always maximal ideals  in  such that the residue field  is a (non-Archimedean) hyperreal field. 

Hyperreal definition 

Sufficient conditions 

 A closed subset of a compact space is compact.
 A finite union of compact sets is compact.
 A continuous image of a compact space is compact.
 The intersection of any non-empty collection of compact subsets of a Hausdorff space is compact (and closed);
 If  is not Hausdorff then the intersection of two compact subsets may fail to be compact (see footnote for example).
 The product of any collection of compact spaces is compact. (This is Tychonoff's theorem, which is equivalent to the axiom of choice.)
 In a metrizable space, a subset is compact if and only if it is sequentially compact (assuming countable choice)
 A finite set endowed with any topology is compact.

Properties of compact spaces 

 A compact subset of a Hausdorff space  is closed. 
 If  is not Hausdorff then the closure of a compact set may fail to be compact (see footnote for example).
 In any topological vector space (TVS), a compact subset is complete. However, every non-Hausdorff TVS contains compact (and thus complete) subsets that are not closed.
 A continuous bijection from a compact space into a Hausdorff space is a homeomorphism.
 A compact Hausdorff space is normal and regular.
 If a subset of a metric space  is compact then it is -bounded.

Functions and compact spaces 

Since a continuous image of a compact space is compact, the extreme value theorem holds for such spaces: a continuous real-valued function on a nonempty compact space is bounded above and attains its supremum. 
(Slightly more generally, this is true for an upper semicontinuous function.) As a sort of converse to the above statements, the pre-image of a compact space under a proper map is compact.

Compactifications 

Ordered compact spaces 

A nonempty compact subset of the real numbers has a greatest element and a least element.

Let  be a simply ordered set endowed with the order topology. 
Then  is compact if and only if  is a complete lattice (i.e. all subsets have suprema and infima).

Examples 

 Any finite topological space, including the empty set, is compact.  More generally, any space with a finite topology (only finitely many open sets) is compact; this includes in particular the trivial topology.
 Any space carrying the cofinite topology is compact.
 Any locally compact Hausdorff space can be turned into a compact space by adding a single point to it, by means of Alexandroff one-point compactification. Using the one-point compactification, one can also easily construct compact spaces which are not Hausdorff, by starting with a non-Hausdorff space.
 The right order topology or left order topology on any bounded totally ordered set is compact. In particular, Sierpiński space is compact.
 No discrete space with an infinite number of points is compact. The collection of all singletons of the space is an open cover which admits no finite subcover. Finite discrete spaces are compact.
 In  carrying the lower limit topology, no uncountable set is compact.
 In the cocountable topology on an uncountable set, no infinite set is compact. Like the previous example, the space as a whole is not locally compact but is still Lindelöf.
 The closed unit interval  is compact. This follows from the Heine–Borel theorem. The open interval  is not compact: the open cover  for  does not have a finite subcover. Similarly, the set of rational numbers in the closed interval  is not compact: the sets of rational numbers in the intervals  cover all the rationals in [0, 1] for  but this cover does not have a finite subcover. Here, the sets are open in the subspace topology even though they are not open as subsets of .
 The set  of all real numbers is not compact as there is a cover of open intervals that does not have a finite subcover.
 On the other hand, the extended real number line carrying the analogous topology is compact; note that the cover described above would never reach the points at infinity and thus would not cover the extended real line.  In fact, the set has the homeomorphism to [−1, 1] of mapping each infinity to its corresponding unit and every real number to its sign multiplied by the unique number in the positive part of interval that results in its absolute value when divided by one minus itself, and since homeomorphisms preserve covers, the Heine-Borel property can be inferred.
 For every natural number , the -sphere is compact. Again from the Heine–Borel theorem, the closed unit ball of any finite-dimensional normed vector space is compact. This is not true for infinite dimensions; in fact, a normed vector space is finite-dimensional if and only if its closed unit ball is compact.
 On the other hand, the closed unit ball of the dual of a normed space is compact for the weak-* topology. (Alaoglu's theorem)
 The Cantor set is compact. In fact, every compact metric space is a continuous image of the Cantor set.
 Consider the set  of all functions  from the real number line to the closed unit interval, and define a topology on  so that a sequence  in  converges towards  if and only if  converges towards  for all real numbers . There is only one such topology; it is called the topology of pointwise convergence or the product topology. Then  is a compact topological space; this follows from the Tychonoff theorem.
 Consider the set  of all functions  satisfying the Lipschitz condition  for all .  Consider on  the metric induced by the uniform distance  Then by Arzelà–Ascoli theorem the space  is compact.
 The spectrum of any bounded linear operator on a Banach space is a nonempty compact subset of the complex numbers . Conversely, any compact subset of  arises in this manner, as the spectrum of some bounded linear operator.

Algebraic examples 

 Compact groups such as an orthogonal group are compact, while groups such as a general linear group are not.
 Since the -adic integers are homeomorphic to the Cantor set, they form a compact set.
 The spectrum of any commutative ring with the Zariski topology (that is, the set of all prime ideals) is compact, but never Hausdorff (except in trivial cases). In algebraic geometry, such topological spaces are examples of quasi-compact schemes, "quasi" referring to the non-Hausdorff nature of the topology.
 The spectrum of a Boolean algebra is compact, a fact which is part of the Stone representation theorem. Stone spaces, compact totally disconnected Hausdorff spaces, form the abstract framework in which these spectra are studied.  Such spaces are also useful in the study of profinite groups.
 The structure space of a commutative unital Banach algebra is a compact Hausdorff space.
 The Hilbert cube is compact, again a consequence of Tychonoff's theorem.
 A profinite group (e.g. Galois group) is compact.

See also 

 Compactly generated space
 Compactness theorem
 Eberlein compactum
 Exhaustion by compact sets
 Lindelöf space
 Metacompact space
 Noetherian topological space
 Orthocompact space
 Paracompact space
 Precompact set - also called totally bounded
 Relatively compact subspace
 Totally bounded

Notes

References

Bibliography 

 
.
.
 (Purely analytic proof of the theorem that between any two values which give results of opposite sign, there lies at least one real root of the equation).

 
 
 
 

  

 
 
 
 .

External links 

 

Compactness (mathematics)
General topology
Properties of topological spaces
Topology